is a Japanese manga series written and illustrated by Shotaro Ishinomori. The manga was serialized in the Futabasha publication Weekly Manga Action from 1967 to 1970, then returned briefly in 1974. The story concerns Miléne Hoffman ("Mylene" in the English translation), a female cyborg who works as a secret agent. The Japanese title of the manga was 009ノ1, or "Zero Zero Ku-no-ichi", a pun on kunoichi (female ninja) and a reference to the main character's espionage occupation.

The original manga was adapted into a live-action drama for Fuji Television in 1969 entitled Flower Action 009ノ1. The manga was also adapted into a 12-episode anime series by Ishimori Entertainment and first broadcast on TBS TV in Japan in late 2006. In June 2013, it was announced the manga would be adapted into a live-action film entitled 009-1: The End of the Beginning to be directed by Koichi Sakamoto, and starring Mayuko Iwasa. Minehiro Kinomoto, Nao Nagasawa, Mao Ichimichi, Shizuka Midorikawa, Naoto Takenaka, and Aya Sugimoto. It premiered on September 7, 2013.

Although it was also created by Ishinomori, and features similar themes, this seinen manga, despite the "00" name and the cybernetized protagonists, has no relation to his previous work Cyborg 009, a shōnen manga (although in the original manga, the cyborgs from Cyborg 009 actually make appearances in some chapters). In the final episode, there are two homages to Gerry Anderson television shows involving the moon, an Eagle Transport from Space: 1999 and SHADO Mobiles from UFO. In the episode "Reverse-Explosion" a spaceship is destroyed by impacting the moon. This is Thunderbird 5 from Gerry Anderson's Thunderbirds.

Premise 
The story is set in an alternate reality where the West and the East blocs have been involved in a cold war for 140 years. Mylene Hoffman is a cyborg spy in the all-female "Nine Number Group", one of the ten groups in the Western Bloc "Zero Zero" intelligence organization. Her codename is "009-1" and she carries out missions assigned by her superiors. Almost her entire body has been cybernetized, and various parts of her body are equipped with special functions.

Characters

Main 

 (009-1)

She is a 009 agent of the all-female "Nine Number Group", one of the ten groups in the "Zero Zero Organization". She is designated as 009-1, but often referred to as "9-1". Almost her entire body has been cybernetized, and various parts of her body are equipped with special functions which are necessary for spy activity. Besides her standard weapon of a ray gun, the WA-P009 (commonly called a plasma gun), she also wears earring communicators, boots with a hidden needle gun, and has 9mm machine guns integrated into her breasts which fire bio-bullets. Her original physical abilities and clear mind makes her the single most outstanding agent in the Zero Zero Organization. She uses a number of aliases such as "Muse", "Miss Nine", "Cool Liz", "Lily Lam", "Mylene Duke", and "Melinda Pierce".

Number Zero is the commander of the "Zero Zero Organization" of the Western Bloc. No one knows his true identity. He can be seen as father figure to Mylene, but during missions, their exchanges are always businesslike. He is essentially calm, cool, and collected, although on occasion, he has shown emotion when speaking with his subordinates.

He is an agent from the Eastern Bloc He is calm, cool, and collected, with a sharp mind and uncommonly-good physical abilities, like "the 009-1 of the Eastern Bloc". He was invited to the haunted castle along with Odin and Freya where he first met Mylene. Later, it is revealed that he is 009-1's younger brother, Paul.

Recurring 
Vanessa Ibert (009-3)

She is a 009 Number agent who has been specially modified with a focus on electronic-analysis equipment. Just by "looking" at the target, the camera built into her eye can store the target's data in her brain's memory. She is also capable of downloading the information she has gained into a compact device through the connector on the back of her neck.
Berta Kastner (009-4)

She is a 009 Number agent who has the most points of cybernetic modification. Her four limbs have been modified, and both elbows and both knees can be equipped with tactical units suited for the particular mission. Her motif is that of Albert Heinrich (004) from Cyborg 009, who was equipped with weapons all over his body.
Mia Connery (009-7)

She is a 009 Number agent whose entire skeletal structure, as well as all of her muscles and skin, are composed of a special biological tissue, making it possible for her to make a complete transformation into any person, far beyond a simple disguise. She has a cute baby-face, but she is a cool agent who does not show sentiment or emotion during a mission.
Ludmilla Schindler

Schindler is the Director of Intelligence of Eastern Bloc's S Area, somewhere in Eastern Europe.
Ivan Gudonov

Gudonov is the Deputy Intelligence Director of Eastern Bloc's S Area. He is a ruthless man who would rather be at war than negotiate for peace.

Publication 
The manga was serialized in 6 volumes of the Futabasha publication Weekly Manga Action during the period between the 10 August 1967 issue to the 14 November 1974 issue.

Media

Anime 
A 12-episode anime series was produced by Ishimori Entertainment and XeNN Studios in partnership with Aniplex and first broadcast on TBS in Japan in late 2006. The anime was licensed for a North American release by A.D. Vision for $325,000. The first volume was released on June 19, 2007, although it was originally scheduled for release in March 2007. In 2008, the show, along with 30 other ADV titles were relicensed to Funimation. Most episodes are self-contained stories except for episodes 10-12 which combine to tell one story.

Episode 13 is an extra episode that was never aired on television and chronologically takes place between episodes 4 and 5. It was included with volume 5 of the Japanese DVD boxed set release.

Episode list

Reception 
Anime News Network's Theron Martin said the anime series "carries much of the style and flavor of Ishinomori's other iconic works like Kamen Rider and Kikaider" and noted "the series emphasizes Mylene's sex appeal by offering healthy and regular doses of fan service, although it leaves the most graphic parts to the imagination." He commented the character designs have "the same angular, caricatured look that all anime series based on Ishinomori's works have, with younger female "good guy" agents invariably being gorgeous sexpots and the bad guys (whether male or female) usually looking quite ugly." Martin also praised the musical score, saying it's "the other star of the series", aside from Mylene.
Writing for Mania Entertainment, Chris Beveridge said 009-1 has "a good sense of pacing and style to it, going over the top in some ways but also keeping itself rather grounded in others. This is a world that I would love to see revisited on a more regular basis and lament that we're already more than halfway past it with this release."

Bryan Morton from Mania Entertainment described it as "James Bond with women, Najica with no panties (no not in that sense), a cold-war Ghost in the Shell - sort of." Morton said "the stories themselves are fairly typical secret-agents tales - recover the scientist, prevent killings and so on - just with a slightly futuristic feel to them", but noted "all the stories hold together well and make sense". As the original manga is "so old", for him "it's amazing that the show still feels contemporary." The kind-heart from the protagonist that is far more you would expect from a spy, "makes it different enough from other secret agent stories to really grab the attention, while the individual stories are a good combination of action and emotion that keep you entertained" in Morton's opinion.

Derek Elley of Film Business Asia gave the film a 6 out of 10. It also received a 4.5/10 rating from iMDB.

Notes

General

Translations

References

Further reading

External links 
 Official Site (TBS) 
 
 Funimation's 009-1 Website
 

1967 manga
1974 comics endings
1969 Japanese television series debuts
1969 Japanese television series endings
2006 Japanese television series debuts
2006 Japanese television series endings
ADV Films
Animax original programming
Anime series based on manga
Aniplex
Cyborg comics
Espionage in anime and manga
Fuji TV original programming
Funimation
Futabasha manga
Girls with guns anime and manga
Japanese television dramas based on manga
Manga adapted into films
Manga adapted into television series
Science fiction anime and manga
Seinen manga
Shotaro Ishinomori
Toei tokusatsu
TBS Television (Japan) original programming
Japanese science fiction films